Aethes luteopictana is a species of moth of the family Tortricidae. It was described by Kennel in 1900. It is found in north-eastern Iran.

References

luteopictana
Moths described in 1900
Taxa named by Julius von Kennel
Moths of Asia